Schwarzwald, Schwarzwalder or Schwarzwälder are German terms referring to the Black Forest. 

They can refer to:

People
Schwarzwald family
Eugenie Schwarzwald (1872–1940), Austrian philanthropist, writer and pedagogue.
Hermann Schwarzwald (1871–1939), Austrian lawyer and bank director married to Eugenie Schwarzwald.
Milton Schwarzwald (1891–1950), American film director, composer and producer.
Jean Schwarzwalder (b. 1980), a roller derby skater known as Suzy Hotrod
Michael Schwarzwalder (1943–2013), member of the Ohio State Senate
Rosemarie Schwarzwälder (b. 1945), Swiss gallery owner, art dealer, and journalist

Places
 Schwarzwald, the large mountainous Black Forest region of Baden-Württemberg, Germany
Hochschwarzwald, the High Black Forest
Mittlerer Schwarzwald, the Central Black Forest 
Nordschwarzwald, the Northern Black Forest
Südschwarzwald, the Southern Black Forest
Schwarzwald, the small village of Feketeerdő, Hungary on the Austrian/Slovak border
Schwarzwald-Baar-Center, a large shopping mall in Villingen-Schwenningen, Germany
Schwarzwald-Baar-Kreis, a Landkreis (district) in the south of Baden-Württemberg, Germany
Schwarzwald Railway (Baden), electrified railway line in Baden-Württemberg, Germany
Schwarzwald-Stadion, football stadium in Freiburg, Baden-Württemberg, Germany
Schwarzwälder Hirschsprung, a local legend that has since become a place name in the Black Forest
Schwarzwälder Hochwald, an area in Rhineland-Palatinate, Germany - not to be confused with the High Black Forest

Food
Schwarzwälder Kirschtorte, a specific type of Black Forest gateau cake
Schwarzwälder Kirschtwasser, a Kirsch brandy made from tart cherries from the Black Forest region
Schwarzwälder Schinken, the Black Forest ham

Organizations
Schwarzwald schools, a system of Austrian girls schools developed by Eugenie Schwarzwald
Schwarzwälder Freilichtmuseum Vogtsbauernhof, the Black Forest Open Air Museum 
Schwarzwaldverein, the oldest German hiking and mountaineering club

Other Uses
10663 Schwarzwald, a minor planet
Schwarzwald, 1997 studio album by the Dutch metal band Unlord
Schwarzwälder Kaltblut, the Black Forest Horse breed

See also
Black Forest (disambiguation)